Communication Disorders Quarterly is a quarterly peer-reviewed academic journal that covers research on  typical and atypical communication, from oral language development to literacy in clinical and educational settings. The editor-in-chief is Judy Montgomery (Chapman University). It was established in 1976 and is currently published by SAGE Publications in association with the Hammill Institute on Disabilities.

Abstracting and indexing 
Communications Disorders Quarterly is abstracted and indexed in:
 CINAHL
 Contents Pages in Education
 Educational Research Abstracts Online
 Linguistics and Language Behavior Abstracts
 PsycINFO
 Scopus
According to the Journal Citation Reports, its 2014 impact factor is 0.66, ranking it 63 out of 69 journals in the category Rehabilitation.

References

External links 
 
 Hammill Institute on Disabilities

SAGE Publishing academic journals
English-language journals
Abnormal psychology journals
Developmental psychology journals
Quarterly journals
Publications established in 1976
Communication journals